Two Bavarians in St. Pauli is a 1956 West German comedy film directed by Hermann Kugelstadt and starring Joe Stöckel, Beppo Brem and Lucie Englisch.

The film's sets were designed by the art director Hans Sohnle and Hans Strobel. It was shot partly on location in Hamburg including at Hagenbeck's Tierpark.

It was followed by three sequels between 1957 and 1962.

Cast
 Joe Stöckel as Ferdinand Lechner
 Beppo Brem as Karl Köpfle
 Lucie Englisch as Kathi Lechner
 Franz Muxeneder as Max
 Ernst Waldow as Eugen Hempel
 Ruth Lommel as Gloria von Merlen
 Michl Lang as Sepp Holzner
 Alexander Golling as Hieronymous Huber
 Gaby Fehling as Bärbel Lechner
 Knut Ihne as Hans Holzner
 Gusti Kreissl as Frau Knöpfle
 Petra Unkel as Fanny
 Rudolf Carl as Obermoser
 Jean Pierre Faye as Neger Theophil
 Bernhard Jakschatat as Gastwirt des "Alt-Bayern"
 Joseph Offenbach as Polizeikomissar
 Franz Loskarn as Dullinger
 Horst Loska as Kirchbacher
 Hans von Morhart as Landrat
 Adi Ferber as Chef im Schiffsereisebüro
 Walter Pötters as Photograph im Zoo
 Gert Wiedenhofen as Kellner im "Grünen Hai"
 Rolf Kralovitz as Photograph im "Grünen Hai"
 Walter Ladengast as Zoowärter
 Beppo Schwaiger as Zoowärter
 Joe Rivé as Portier im "Grünen Hai"

References

Bibliography 
 Beni Eppenberger & Daniel Stapfer. Mädchen, Machos und Moneten: die unglaubliche Geschichte des SchweizerKinounternehmers Erwin C. Dietrich. Verlag Scharfe Stiefel, 2006.

External links 
 

1956 films
West German films
German comedy films
1956 comedy films
1950s German-language films
Films directed by Hermann Kugelstadt
Films set in Hamburg
Films shot in Hamburg
1950s German films
German black-and-white films